North Sydney Oval is a multi-use sporting facility in North Sydney, New South Wales, Australia, owned and operated by North Sydney Council. First used as a cricket ground in 1867, it is also used for Australian rules football, rugby league, rugby union and soccer.

History

Development

The first cricket pitch was laid on 6 December 1867, making it one of the oldest cricket grounds in Australia. A simple pavilion overlooking the cricket ground was the first structure at the oval, built in 1879 and replaced in 1909. This was replaced by another pavilion which in turn was replaced by what is now the Duncan Thompson Stand in 1929.

The venue was renovated in 1931 due to complaints that the surface was 'like concrete' and that the ground was liable to cause serious injury to players. Nonetheless, as late as the 1980s, the ground was sometimes referred to as "Concrete Park". In 1935, the timber fence was replaced by a high brick wall and concrete terrace seating 1,200 people was built.

Major renovations were undertaken in the 1980s. The old grandstand was named after North Sydney Bears player Duncan Thompson. New stands were built and named after cricketers Bill O'Reilly, Charlie Macartney and Mollie Dive. In 1983, the venerable Bob Stand was moved to North Sydney Oval from the Sydney Cricket Ground. The hill became known as the Doug Walters Stand. Drainage and irrigation systems were installed and the pitch was re-laid in 1989.

In 1992, the oval won a Sydney Cricket Association award for "Ground of the Year".

North Sydney Oval first trialed the technology in 1998, when cricket wicket technology was in its early stages. Since then, the technology has improved substantially and is used by many premier sporting stadiums including Sydney Showground Stadium, Adelaide Oval and the MCG.

In 2015 it was announced that North Sydney Oval would be receiving an upgrade. The upgrades will continue until the year 2019/2020.

Usage

Rugby league
North Sydney Oval has been the home ground of the North Sydney Bears since their inception in 1908. The first top grade rugby league match to be played at the oval came in round 1 of the 1910 NSWRL season where North Sydney defeated Glebe 13-9 in front of 3000 spectators.  The club currently plays in the NSW Cup and still attracts spectators to home games at the oval. Only two grounds have hosted more first grade rugby league matches.

In 2004, South Sydney experimented with playing two home games at the ground. The first match between Souths and Manly-Warringah Sea Eagles attracted 14,855 spectators.

Legendary North Sydney, New South Wales and Australian winger Ken Irvine, who played 176 games and scored 633 points for the Bears (171 tries, 59 goals and 1 field goal) between 1958 and 1970 before transferring to Manly from 1971–73 before retiring, has the scoreboard at the oval named in his honour.

The last first grade game North Sydney played here was on August 22, 1999 against Melbourne.  North Sydney won the match 24-20.  The last first grade game played at the oval was on May 21, 2005 when South Sydney played a home match here against the New Zealand Warriors. The Warriors went on to win the game 34-16. As part of the Central Coast Bears' bid to enter the NRL in 2006, North Sydney planned to play one home game a year against Manly if their bid was successful.

In 2018, North Sydney Oval hosted the inaugural State of Origin women's match where New South Wales defeated Queensland 16-10.
Also in 2018, North Sydney Oval was featured in a Channel 9 game for the first time since 1999 when Norths played against the Western Suburbs Magpies.

On 21 June 2019, North Sydney Oval hosted the State of Origin women's match for the second year running with a crowd of 10,515 in attendance as New South Wales defeated Queensland 14-4.
In 2022, North Sydney were looking to re-enter the NRL as the 18th team. The bid would propose having some games being played at North Sydney Oval as part of the licence being awarded.

Cricket
The New South Wales Blues cricket team play regular Sheffield Shield, Ryobi Cup and Twenty20 Cricket matches at the Oval. The oval hosted the final of the inaugural Twenty20 domestic knock-out cup competition between NSW Blues and Victorian Bushrangers. It also plays home to the North Sydney Grade club. The ground was the host for 6 group matches and the final of the 2009 Women's Cricket World Cup.

It has hosted 5 women's test matches, with Australia playing England there in 1957/58, 1968/69 and 1991/92, 2017 (which was also the first even day-night Women's Test match) and India in 1990/91 and 12 one day internationals.  New South Wales have played 3 first class matches there and 21 List A one-day games.

In September and October 2013 Sydney will host the 2013–14 Ryobi One-Day Cup. North Sydney Oval was chosen as one of the host venues along with Bankstown, Hurstville, Drummoyne ovals and the Blacktown AFL/Cricket Stadium, with North Sydney and Bankstown being the two venues used for nationally broadcast games on Channel 9 and on their HD station GEM. North Sydney will host seven games of the 20 game tournament, including the playoff for 3rd and 4th on 24 October and the final to be played on 27 October.

Rugby union
Rugby union has been played at the St Leonards Park complex since the late 1890s with the North Shore Football Club (known as the 'Pirates') playing matches there.  In 1900 North Shore merged with the Wallaroos club to form Northern Suburbs Rugby Club and has had North Sydney Oval as their home ground ever since, playing all their home games in the Shute Shield at the ground.

The stadium was also briefly home to the Sydney Fleet during the short lived (single season) Australian Rugby Championship. With the elimination of this competition, Rugby events at the oval are limited to Northern Suburbs home games and promotional activities held by the Australian Rugby Union such as Wallaby 'Fan Days' and open training sessions.

Soccer
North Sydney Oval was the home ground for Northern Spirit FC (now known as GHFA Spirit FC), a now defunct club of the defunct Australian National Soccer League.  In its inaugural season in 1998, an average of 15,000 spectators attended Northern Spirit FC games at North Sydney Oval including 18,985 for their first game against Sydney Olympic FC.  It is generally accepted that North Sydney Oval is a poor venue for football.  The ground is hard and compacted to cater for cricket, and for many months there is a cricket pitch in the middle of the ground.  Northern Spirit FC paid to have a removable cricket pitch installed, but the ongoing costs of this were prohibitive.  Northern Spirit also obtained government funding for half of the new lighting installed, while NSFC paid the other half.  This was a major success for the club as before the new permanent lighting was installed, the older lighting was not bright enough to allow television broadcasts of night games.  For 2 years Northern Spirit had hired a large amount of lighting for each game to get around the problem.

In August 2013, it was announced that Hyundai A-League side Central Coast Mariners will host a community round match against New Zealand side Wellington Phoenix at the oval on 19 December. This will be the first time an A-League match will be played at North Sydney Oval since it superseded the National Soccer League as the top Australian league in football.

In June 2014 the Mariners announced their intention to play at least one home game per season at North Sydney Oval, starting with their Round 10 fixture against Melbourne Victory.

Australian rules

The Australian Football League club, Sydney Swans, has played a number of matches at the oval against both Sydney Football League opposition and an annual exhibition match against fellow AFL team Essendon.

In 2005 the Sydney Swans played a pre-season friendly match against Essendon in front of a crowd of 9,654.

In the 2006 match, a full strength Essendon (89) defeated the young outfit of the reigning premiers (71) in front of a crowd of 8,461.

In 2007, the Collingwood replaced Essendon in what has become a regular pre-season friendly against the Swans over the past five years.  In the 2007 match held on Friday 16 February, Sydney (66) defeated Collingwood (51) in front of a crowd of 9,560.

On 27 August 2022, the venue hosted its first AFL/AFLW premiership match when  played  in round one of AFL Women's season seven; with an attendance of 8,264, it set a new record for a standalone women's fixture in New South Wales.

Sunset cinema
Since 2003, North Sydney Oval has been used during evenings in January and February as a venue for outdoor cinema on an inflatable screen.

International cricket centuries

North Sydney Oval

Women's Test centuries
Three WTest centuries have been scored at the venue.

Women's One Day International centuries
Three WODI centuries have been scored at the venue.

Women's T20 International centuries
One WT20I century has been scored at the venue.

North Sydney Oval No. 2

Women's One Day International centuries
One WODI century has been scored at the venue.

International cricket five-wicket hauls

Women's Test five-wicket hauls
There are two WTest five-wicket hauls that have been taken at this venue.

Women's One Day International five-wicket hauls
There is one WODI five-wicket haul that has been taken at this venue.

Women's T20 International five-wicket hauls 
One WT20I five-wicket haul has been taken at this venue.

References

North Sydney Council
Rugby league stadiums in Australia
Rugby union stadiums in Australia
Soccer venues in Sydney
Cricket grounds in New South Wales
Australian rules football grounds
Sports venues in Sydney
North Sydney Bears
1867 establishments in Australia
Sports venues completed in 1867
Women's Big Bash League
GHFA Spirit FC
North Sydney, New South Wales